Metrostav a.s. is a Czech based universal construction company. It is the largest construction company in the Czech Republic and second largest in Central and South-Eastern Europe.

History 
Formed in 1990 from a state company of the same name after the fall of the communist regime in the country. Originally Metrostav was created in 1971 with a sole purpose to build Prague metro. After 1990 it was transformed into a universal construction company active in all fields of construction business. Metrostav is also a leading member of Metrostav Group Concern.

Organizational structure 

Metrostav is divided into 8 construction divisions based on their focus.

Metrostav is also a leading member of Metrostav Group Concern, that includes among others:  Subterra a.s., BeMo Tunelling GmbH, Pragis a.s., Metrostav Development a.s., Metrostav Slovakia a.s., SQZ, s.r.o., BES s.r.o., PK Doprastav, a.s., Doprastav Asfalt a.s., Metrostav Deutschland GmbH and Metrostav Nemovitostní, closed investment fund, a.s.

Markets 
The main market of the company is the Czech Republic, but it is increasing its presence in the neighboring countries Slovakia, Poland and in Nordic countries.

List of all countries where Metrostav is present: Slovakia, Poland, Germany, Turkey, Belarus, Iceland, Norway, Finland, Croatia, Turkey

Important projects 
 Prague Metro, Line A, Line B and Line C, most recently Metro V.A, 6.1 km long new section excavated ba TBM method, including 4 stations, commissioned in April 2015
 Blanka Tunnel complex in Prague, 5.5 km, the longest city tunnel in Europe
 Troja Bridge, Prague, 2014
 Nordfjordur tunnel, Iceland
 Czech National Museum renovation, 2016

References

Construction and civil engineering companies of the Czech Republic
1991 establishments in Czechoslovakia
Construction and civil engineering companies established in 1991